Baldhead Slick & da Click is the fourth solo studio album by American hip hop musician Guru. It was released on September 25, 2001 via Ill Kid/Landspeed Records, marking Guru's first solo recording outside his Jazzmatazz series. Production was handled by Alchemist, Adam West, Agallah, Ayatollah, Biggest Gord, Divine, DJ Roach, DJ Spinna, DJ Yutaka, E-Boogie, Gang Starr, G-Flexx, J-Love, Pete Rock, P.F. Cuttin', Smitty, Stoupe the Enemy of Mankind and The Committee. It features guest appearances from Big Shug, Kaeson, Kreem.com, Lae D-Trigga, Mendoughza, New Child, Black Jesus, Bless, Blick Street, Don Parmazhane, Ed O.G., Gold D, Hannibal Stax, Hussein Fatal, Ice-T, James Gotti, Kapital Gainz, Killa Kaine, Killah Priest, Krumbsnatcha, Mr. Moe, Pete Powers, Smitty, Squala Orphan, Suspectz, Tef, Timbo King and Treach. The album peaked at number 122 on the Billboard 200, number 22 on the Top R&B/Hip-Hop Albums, number 5 on the Independent Albums and topped the Heatseekers Albums in the United States.

Track listing 

Sample credits
Track 4 contains parts of U-God's and Inspectah Deck's verses from Wu-Tang Clan's Da Mystery of Chessboxin'.

Personnel
Keith "Guru" Elam – main artist, producer (tracks: 4, 12), mixing (tracks: 1, 3-5, 7-10, 12-16, 18, 19), executive producer

Mendoughza – featured artist (tracks: 2, 16)
Cary "Big Shug" Guy – featured artist (tracks: 3, 18)
Edward "Ed O.G." Anderson – featured artist (track 3)
Demetrius "Krumb Snatcha" Gibbs – featured artist (track 3)
Tracy "Ice-T" Marrow – featured artist (track 5)
Suspectz – featured artist (track 5)
Anthony "Treach" Criss – featured artist (track 6)
Gold D. – featured artist (track 6)
Kaeson – featured artist (tracks: 6, 11)
Black Jesus – featured artist (track 7)
Timothy "Timbo King" Drayton – featured artist (track 7)
Walter "Killah Priest" Reed – featured artist (track 7)
Kapital Gainz – featured artist (track 8)
Kreem.com – featured artist (tracks: 8, 11)
Linwood "Teflon" Starling – featured artist (track 10)
Don Parmazhane – featured artist (track 10)
Benjamin "Bless" Rinehart – featured artist (track 12)
Lae D-Trigga – featured artist (tracks: 12, 16)
Wallace "New Child" Lynch – featured artist (tracks: 13, 16)
"James Gotti" Earl Floyd – featured artist (track 13)
Bruce "Hussein Fatal" Washington – featured artist (track 13)
Endre "Mr." Moe – featured artist (track 14)
Killa Kaine – featured artist (track 14)
Pete Powers – featured artist (track 14)
Blick Street – featured artist (track 15)
Squala Orphan – featured artist (track 15)
Steven "Smitty" Smith – featured artist, producer & mixing (track 17)
Steven "H Stax" Johnson – featured artist (track 18)
Gordon "Biggest Gord" Franklin – producer (track 1)
Chris "DJ Premier" Martin – producer (track 2)
Angel "8-Off Agallah" Aguilar – producer (track 3)
"DJ Yutaka" Futagawa – producer & mixing (track 4)
Earl "E-Boogie" Thomason – producer (track 5)
Felix "P.F. Cuttin'" Rovira – producer & mixing (track 6)
Daniel "Alchemist" Maman – producer (tracks: 7, 14)
Adam West – producer (track 8)
Lamont "Ayatollah" Dorrell – producer (track 9)
Divine – producer (track 10)
Peter "Pete Rock" Phillips – producer (track 11)
Patrice "Mix Master G-Flexx" Germain – producer (track 12)
Kevin "Stoupe the Enemy of Mankind" Baldwin – producer (track 13)
Jason "J-Love" Elias – producer (track 15)
Vincent "DJ Spinna" Williams – producer (track 16)
The Committee – producers (track 18)
DJ Roach – producers (track 19)
Taurus "Big Deal" Braxton-Harvey – recording & mixing (tracks: 1, 3, 5, 7-10, 12-16, 18, 19)
Eddie Sancho – recording & mixing (track 2)
Dexter Thibou – assistant recording & mixing (track 2)
C-Murder – engineering (track 4)
James "Jamie" Staub – recording & mixing (track 11)
Pete Peloquin – recording (track 17)
Trevor "Karma" Gendron – art direction
Razi – photography
Matt Slywka – A&R
Lakya "Kiki" Spicer – A&R
LaRon Batchelor – management
Owen H. Lamb – management
Mark Grossman – legal
Mark Levinsohn – legal
Randall M. Cutler – legal

Charts

References

External links

2001 albums
Guru (rapper) albums
Albums produced by Guru
Albums produced by Agallah
Albums produced by Ayatollah
Albums produced by DJ Spinna
Albums produced by Pete Rock
Albums produced by DJ Premier
Albums recorded at Greene St. Recording
Albums produced by the Alchemist (musician)